Patrick Kelly (born 14 August 1985) is an Irish Gaelic footballer. His league and championship career at senior level with the Cork county team spanned nine seasons from 2008 to 2016.

Born in Cork, Kelly first played competitive Gaelic football during his schooling at Coláiste Choilm. Here he had Moran Cup and Frewen Cup successes. Kelly first appeared for the Ballincollig club at underage levels, winning divisional minor and under-21 championship medals. As a member of the club's senior team he won a county senior championship medal in 2014.

Kelly made his debut on the inter-county scene at the age of seventeen when he was selected for the Cork minor team. He played for one championship season with the minor team, and was a Munster runner-up. Kelly subsequently joined the Cork under-21 team, winning three successive Munster medals between 2004 and 2006. He made his debut during the 2008 league. Over the course of the next nine years Kelly had several successes, culminating with the winning of an All-Ireland medal in 2010. He also won three Munster medals and three National Football League medals. He played his last game for Cork in July 2016 and announced his retirement in January 2017.

After being chosen on the Munster inter-provincial team for the first time in 2005, Kelly made a number of appearances over the following years. During that time he won one Railway Cup medal.

Career statistics

Honours
Ballincollig
Cork Senior Football Championship (1): 2014

Cork
All-Ireland Senior Football Championship (1): 2010
Munster Senior Football Championship (3): 2008, 2009, 2012
National Football League Division 1 (3): 2010, 2011, 2012
National Football League Division 2 (1): 2009
Munster Under-21 Football Championship (1): 2004, 2005, 2006

Munster
Railway Cup (1): 2008

References

1985 births
Living people
Ballincollig Gaelic footballers
Cork inter-county Gaelic footballers
Irish international rules football players
Irish schoolteachers
Munster inter-provincial Gaelic footballers
UCC Gaelic footballers
Winners of one All-Ireland medal (Gaelic football)